The 1997–98 Elitserien season was the 23rd season of the Elitserien, the top level of ice hockey in Sweden. 12 teams participated in the league, and Farjestads BK won the championship.

Standings

Playoffs

External links
 Swedish Hockey League official site

Swe
1997–98 in Swedish ice hockey
Swedish Hockey League seasons